Donald Stanfield Max (7 March 1906 – 4 March 1972) was a New Zealand rugby union player. A lock and loose forward, Max represented Nelson at a provincial level, and was a member of the New Zealand national side, the All Blacks, from 1931 to 1934. He played eight matches for the All Blacks including three internationals.  After his retirement as a player, Max was active as an administrator, serving as president of the New Zealand Rugby Football Union in 1949.

In 2009, Max was inducted into the Nelson Legends of Sport gallery.

References

1906 births
1972 deaths
People educated at Nelson College
New Zealand rugby union players
New Zealand international rugby union players
New Zealand Rugby Football Union officials
Nelson rugby union players
Rugby union players from Nelson, New Zealand
Rugby union locks